Ane Halsboe-Jørgensen (born 4 May 1983 in Brovst) is a Danish politician, who is a member of the Folketing for the Social Democrats. She has been the Minister for Culture and Ecclesiastical Affairs  since 2021. She was elected member of Folketinget for the Social Democrats in 2011. She was appointed Minister of Higher Education and Science in the Frederiksen Cabinet from 27 June 2019. On 16 August 2021, the former Minister of Church and Ecclesiastical Affairs Joy Mogensen resigned and Halsboe-Jørgensen took over the position.

Political career
Halsboe-Jørgensen was first elected into parliament at the 2011 Danish general election, where she received 5,171 votes. She was reelected in 2015 with 8,285 votes and in 2019 with 4,977 votes.

References

External links 
 Biography on the website of the Danish Parliament (Folketinget)

1983 births
Living people
People from Jammerbugt Municipality
Women members of the Folketing
Social Democrats (Denmark) politicians
21st-century Danish women politicians
Women government ministers of Denmark
Education ministers of Denmark
Members of the Folketing 2011–2015
Members of the Folketing 2015–2019
Members of the Folketing 2019–2022
Members of the Folketing 2022–2026
20th-century Danish women